Sir Henry Bernhard Samuelson, 2nd Baronet JP KGStJ (30 September 1845 – 14 March 1937) was an English Liberal Party politician who sat in the House of Commons in two periods between 1868 and 1885.

Early life
Samuelson was the son of Sir Bernhard Samuelson, 1st Baronet and his wife Caroline Blundell. After his mother's death, his father married Lelia Mathilda ( Serena) Denny, daughter of Chevalier Leon Serena and the widow of William Denny of Dumbarton. Among his siblings were Francis Arthur Edward Samuelson, Godfrey Blundell Samuelson, MP for Forest of Dean, and Sir Herbert Walter Samuelson, chairman and treasurer of University College Hospital. 

His mother was a daughter of Henry Blundell of Hull and his paternal grandparents were Sarah ( Hertz) Samuelson and Samuel Hermann Samuelson, a Liverpool merchant.

He was educated at Rugby School and Trinity College, Oxford.

Career
He was a captain in the Royal South Gloucester Militia and a J.P. for Somerset.

At the 1868 general election Samuelson was elected as the Member of Parliament (MP) for Cheltenham. He held the seat until his defeat at the 1874 general election. In November 1876 he was elected at a by-election as the MP for Frome, and held that seat until the 1885 general election, when he did not stand again.

Samuelson succeeded to the baronetcy on the death of his father in 1905.

Personal life
Samuelson married Emily Maria ( Goodden) Butler, daughter of John Goodden of Compton House, in Over Compton, Dorset. Emily was the widow of Arthur Paulet Butler (a grandson of James Butler, 13th/23rd Baron Dunboyne).

He died at the age of 91. As he died without male issue, he was succeeded in the baronetcy by his younger brother, Francis.

References

External links
 

1845 births
1937 deaths
English Jews
Liberal Party (UK) MPs for English constituencies
UK MPs 1868–1874
UK MPs 1874–1880
UK MPs 1880–1885
People educated at Rugby School
Alumni of Trinity College, Oxford
Baronets in the Baronetage of the United Kingdom
Politics of Cheltenham